Stereocyclops incrassatus is a species of frog in the family Microhylidae. It is endemic to eastern Brazil and is known from Pernambuco and Alagoas in the north and then southward through Bahia to Minas Gerais and Espírito Santo. Earlier records from São Paulo state are now recognized as Stereocyclops parkeri. Common name Brazilian dumpy frog has been coined for this species.

Description
The holotype, an adult male, measures  in snout–vent length (SVL). In a population in Linhares observed at the time of breeding, adult males measured  and females  in SVL. The body is very stout. The snout is short, rounded in dorsal view but more acute in profile. The eyes are small and the tympanum is indistinct. The fingers are fairly long and have no webbing. The toes are long and have basal webbing. Skin is smooth except for a few granules on the sides.

Habitat and conservation
Its natural habitats are primary and secondary forests at elevations below . It is a nocturnal species living in leaf litter. They prey on a range of small invertebrates. The dominant prey items in Linhares were ants, followed by beetles and isopods. Breeding seems to be explosive. Breeding takes place in small, temporary ponds inside the forest; the species is not found in open habitat outside forest.

Stereocyclops incrassatus can be very common at breeding sites. Habitat loss is the major threat to this species. It occurs in several protected areas, e.g., Rio Doce State Park.

References

incrassatus
Amphibians of Brazil
Endemic fauna of Brazil
Taxa named by Edward Drinker Cope
Amphibians described in 1870
Taxonomy articles created by Polbot